South West Scotland is an ambiguous term that can include Ayrshire, Galloway, Dumfriesshire, the Stewartry of Kirkcudbright, as well as Lanarkshire, Renfrewshire. However the inclusion or exclusion of these areas is to an extent arbitrary: the only unquestionable boundaries of South West Scotland are the border with the nearby county of Cumbria in North West England and the sea, namely the Solway Firth, the North Channel and the Firth of Clyde. The area has a complex cultural history. At one time it formed part of the Kingdom of Strathclyde, the last stronghold of the Britons in what is now Scotland, after what was then called Lothian and would now be called South East Scotland succumbed to the Anglo Saxon Kingdom of Northumbria. Later it became subject to settlement by Anglo Saxons, Gaels and perhaps Vikings or Norse Gaels. When all of what would today be called South West Scotland became incorporated within Scotland is not entirely clear.

References

External links 

Geography of Scotland